Association football team rosters for the 2013 OFC U-20 Championship, the Oceanic Youth Championship.

Coach:  Ravinesh Kumar

|-

! colspan="9"  style="background:#b0d3fb; text-align:left;"|
|- style="background:#dfedfd;"

|-

! colspan="9"  style="background:#b0d3fb; text-align:left;"|
|- style="background:#dfedfd;"

|-
! colspan="9"  style="background:#b0d3fb; text-align:left;"|
|- style="background:#dfedfd;"

Coach:  Matthieu Delcroix

Coach:  Chris Milicich

Coach:  Wesley Waiwai

Coach:  Moise Poida

References
 

2013